Yujiawu Hui Ethnic Township is an ethnic township on southern Tongzhou District,Beijing, China. It shares border with Zhangjiawan and Huoxian Towns in its north, Yongledian Town in its east, Caiyu Town in the southwest, and Majuqiao Town in the west. Its population was 34,734.

History

Administration divisions 
As of 2021, Yujiawu had 25 subdivisions underneath, where 2 of them were communities, and the other 23 were villages:

Economics 
In the year 2018, Yujiawu's tax revenue was 820 million yuan, the average disposable income was 26,000 yuan.

See also 

 List of township-level divisions of Beijing

References 

Township-level divisions of Beijing
Tongzhou District, Beijing
Ethnic townships of the People's Republic of China